Entry of Christ into Jerusalem can refer to the following:

Triumphal entry into Jerusalem
Entry of Christ into Jerusalem (Master of Taüll), a twelfth century fresco
Entry of Christ into Jerusalem (van Dyck), a seventeenth century oil painting